Keith Phillip Williams (born April 8, 1988) is a former American football offensive guard. He was drafted by the Pittsburgh Steelers in the sixth round of the 2011 NFL Draft. He played college football at Nebraska.

Early years 
Williams attended McCluer North High School, playing both offensive and defensive tackle. In his senior year, he recorded 24 tackles, one sack, and one fumble recovery while leading his team to its second consecutive state championship appearance. He earned all-state honors both on offense and defense, and was named in the top 15 of Rivals.com recruits in Missouri. He chose to attend the University of Nebraska in 2006.

College career 
Earning a starting role in his sophomore year after being redshirted in 2006, Williams became a consistent performer on the starting offensive line. He helped pave the way for a strong rushing attack, with Nebraska leading the Big 12 in rushing yards, and allowed three players to run for over 900 yards each. Williams earned 34 starts in his career at Nebraska, the most of any player in Nebraska's offense. He was named to Rivals.com's second-team All-Big 12, Phil Steele's third-team All-Big 12, and also earned positions in the Honorable-Mention All-Big 12 team of the Associated Press and Coaches teams.

Professional career

Pittsburgh Steelers
Williams was selected with the 31st pick of the 6th round by the Pittsburgh Steelers. He was released by the Steelers on September 2, 2011.

Buffalo Bills
Williams was signed to the Bills practice squad on September 20, 2011. On August 20, 2013, he was waived/injured by the Bills. On August 21, 2013, he cleared waivers and was placed on the Bills' injured reserve list. On August 26, 2013, he was waived with an injury settlement.

Arizona Rattlers
On February 17, 2014, Williams was assigned to the Arizona Rattlers of the Arena Football League (AFL).

Cleveland Gladiators
On January 31, 2017, Williams was assigned to the Cleveland Gladiators. He was placed on reassignment on March 9, 2017.

References

External links 

Buffalo Bills bio

1988 births
Living people
Players of American football from Missouri
American football offensive guards
Nebraska Cornhuskers football players
Pittsburgh Steelers players
Buffalo Bills players
Arizona Rattlers players
Cleveland Gladiators players
Sportspeople from St. Louis County, Missouri
People from Florissant, Missouri